Piscine: pertaining to fish.

It is also a French noun meaning "swimming pool"; see La Piscine (disambiguation).
The Latin word piscina (or sacrarium) denotes a shallow basin placed near the altar of a church.
Localities
Piscina (TO), municipality in the Italian province of Turin
Piscinas, municipality in Sardinia

See also
Piscine Molitor
The lengthened first name of the main character in either:
Life of Pi, or
Life of Pi (film)

fr:Piscine (homonymie)